The Mooney Mooney Bridge, officially the Mooney Mooney Creek Bridge,  and popularly known as The NSW Big Dipper Bridge, is a twin cantilever bridge that carries the Pacific Motorway (M1) across Mooney Mooney Creek, located near  in the Brisbane Water National Park on the Central Coast of New South Wales, Australia. The concrete box girder bridge was opened on 14 December 1986 by the Prime Minister of Australia, Bob Hawke, and is owned and maintained by Transport for NSW, an agency of the Government of New South Wales.

The Pacific Motorway is the main road link between Sydney, the Central Coast and the Hunter Region.

History 
The Pacific Highway (now known as B83) served as the only highway route between Sydney and the Central Coast and the Hunter Region. The original 1930 two-lane steel truss bridge carried the Old Pacific Highway across Mooney Mooney Creek. This bridge remains in concurrent use and is located downstream of the existing Mooney Mooney Bridge. With population and traffic growth, the scenic winding highway route was beset by traffic jams, especially at peak holiday times.

In October 1973 the Peats Ferry Bridge was duplicated as the Brooklyn Bridge, connecting the Berowra-Hawkesbury River and Hawkesbury River-Calga sections.

The  section between Calga and Somersby, including the new Mooney Mooney Creek bridge was opened on 14 December 1986, as thousands of people walked across the twin bridges. The freeway carried two lanes heading north and two lanes heading south. Additional developments were made as follows:
 September 1987freeway was completed from Wallarah Creek interchange to Mandalong Road interchange
 March 1988freeway completed from Mandalong Road interchange to Freemans Waterhole interchange
 March 1989Wahroonga to Berowra section opened
 December 1990section from  interchange to Palmer's Road completed
 December 1993Palmer's Road to  section opened
 December 1997"missing link" between Ourimbah and Kangy Angy opened
 November 1998final stage of freeway opened between Minmi and John Renshaw Drive, Beresfield
 December 2004completion of widening to six lanes of the four-lane sections between the Hawkesbury River and Calga
 August 2013road signs are being changed to show the new M1 marker and the new name Pacific Motorway as part of the statewide alpha numeric route scheme.

Design
Mooney Mooney Bridge was designed by Bruce Judd of the then NSW Department of Main Roads and built by Enpro Constructions by the free cantilever method of post tensioned concrete. It consists of twin bridges, each bridge with a main span and two approach spans.

The design has been said to demonstrate how good engineering design and good aesthetics are synonymous, and has been used as a standard in the design of bridges throughout New South Wales. They employ a two rail parapet which optimises views of the landscape. The bridges were designed with the natural surroundings in mind and form a simple uncluttered shape so not to detract from the natural bushland of the national park. The three span haunched girders on the bridge were critical to this as were the multiple piers that provide character and strength.

Incidents
The Mooney Mooney Bridge has been the site of several accidents, resulting in the Pacific Motorway being closed to traffic and causing delays. Some of these accidents have prompted debate on whether a new road should be built to supplement the existing freeway.

On 23 October 2004 a semi-trailer's brakes failed coming down the Freeway and caused a pile-up involving 35 vehicles that had slowed down as a result of a car accident on the other side of the bridge. This accident resulted in the death of a woman. On 12 February 2007 another accident occurred when a truck was travelling down the freeway and lost control approaching the bridge, smashing through a guard rail and plunging 30 metres down an embankment at the side of the bridge.

The Mooney Mooney Bridge, because of its height, has been susceptible in the past to people committing suicide. As a result, a fence was erected along the side of the bridge to prevent people jumping off. This fence was erected in 2003 and cost A$1,000,000.

Gallery

See also

 Brooklyn Bridge
 Peats Ferry Bridge
 Great North Walk

References

External links

 Roads and Traffic Authority

Road bridges in New South Wales
Bridges completed in 1986
Transport on the Central Coast (New South Wales)
Hawkesbury River
1986 establishments in Australia
Pacific Highway (Australia)
Cantilever bridges
Concrete bridges in Australia
Box girder bridges